Nese Group (formerly Nese) is an entertainment group based in Klaipėda, Lithuania. It operates through three brands: Nese, Pramogu Bankas and Sekmes Tiltas. Focusing to three key segments, casino gaming, casual dining and real estate. Company is owned and chaired by Kazys Paulikas.

Nese operates through its casinos in Vilnius and Klaipeda. Nese also has another 4 properties that focuses in Class-II slot machines. Nese also has an online betting system called NeseSport. Nese was also a sponsor of the bushido championship and Klaipeda's basketball team.

Easy Lounge
opened in 2013 bar is located above Irish Nese Pub. Its main theme is an upscale ambient restaurant. Main meniu is based on mediterranean food.

References

External links 
 

Gambling companies
Gambling companies established in 1991
Companies based in Klaipėda
Entertainment companies of Lithuania